Kevin William O'Connell (born May 25, 1985), nicknamed "KOC", is an American football coach and former player who is the head coach for the Minnesota Vikings of the National Football League (NFL). O'Connell played quarterback at San Diego State University, and was selected by the New England Patriots in the third round of the 2008 NFL Draft. O'Connell also played for the Detroit Lions, Miami Dolphins, New York Jets, and San Diego Chargers before retiring in 2012. O'Connell's NFL coaching career began in 2015; he held various assistant coaching roles on the Cleveland Browns, San Francisco 49ers, Washington Redskins, and Los Angeles Rams (where he won Super Bowl LVI, as offensive coordinator, in the 2021–2022 season).

Early years
O'Connell is the son of a former  FBI agent. He spent his childhood in Carlsbad, California, where he attended La Costa Canyon High School. At La Costa Canyon, O'Connell lettered in both football and basketball. In football, as a junior, he passed for 980 yards and seven touchdowns. As a senior, he was named his team's Most Valuable Player, and selected to All-League, All-North County, and All-San Diego teams. In basketball, he was a two-year letterman, and a teammate of Arizona standout Chase Budinger. O'Connell graduated from La Costa Canyon in 2003.

Playing career

College
O'Connell graduated from San Diego State University in December 2007 with a degree in political science. At SDSU, where he was a four-year team captain, he started 21 games, the sixth-most among SDSU quarterbacks, and ranked first in school history in career rushing yards and second in career rushing touchdowns among quarterbacks; in 2007 he led the team in rushing yards. Passing, he ranked tenth in yardage, eighth in attempts, and seventh in completions.

O'Connell played in both the 2008 Hula Bowl and the 2008 East-West Shrine Game. He was the Kai team quarterback in the 2008 Hula Bowl, where he led the offense and was one of the Kai team's only bright spots. He was 11-of-21 for 147 yards, and completed the pass which resulted in the Kai's only score of the game.

At the 2008 NFL Combine, O'Connell ran the 40-yard dash in 4.61 seconds; only University of San Diego quarterback Josh Johnson had a faster time.

New England Patriots

The New England Patriots selected O'Connell with their fourth pick (94th overall) in the third round of the 2008 NFL Draft. O'Connell rushed for a touchdown in the 2008 preseason against the New York Giants in the fourth quarter, in a game the Patriots eventually lost 19–14. He made his NFL debut on September 21, 2008, in the fourth quarter against the Miami Dolphins, throwing his first four career passes and completing three.

O'Connell was waived by the Patriots on August 30, 2009, two days after a preseason game in which starting quarterback Tom Brady was injured, and, in the second half, O'Connell threw two interceptions and only threw 3 completions on 10 attempts. The Patriots gave no explanation for releasing O'Connell, who was in competition with veteran quarterback Andrew Walter, signed after his release from the Oakland Raiders, and undrafted free agent rookie Brian Hoyer of Michigan State.

Detroit Lions
O'Connell was claimed off waivers by the Detroit Lions on September 1, 2009.

New York Jets
The Lions traded O'Connell to the New York Jets, for a 7th round 2011 draft pick, on September 6, 2009.

He was named a team captain for the September 20 game against the New England Patriots.

On August 31, 2010, New York released O'Connell. Following his departure, O'Connell found that he had a torn labrum in his throwing arm, an injury he sustained during the preseason. The injury required surgery.

Following his release, the New York Jets re-signed O'Connell to a two-year deal. He had been placed on the injured reserve list. He was later released again on July 29, 2011.

Miami Dolphins
On August 5, 2011, O'Connell signed with the Miami Dolphins, but was waived on September 3.

Second stint with the Jets
O'Connell was claimed off waivers by the Jets on September 4, 2011.

San Diego Chargers
O'Connell was signed by the San Diego Chargers on July 29, 2012, to serve as an emergency back-up in the Chargers' practices with Charlie Whitehurst suffering an injury and Kyle Boller announcing his retirement from the league. He was released on August 12, 2012.

NFL statistics

Coaching career

Cleveland Browns
On February 17, 2015, it was announced that O'Connell was named to the position of quarterbacks coach of the Cleveland Browns for the 2015 NFL season.

San Francisco 49ers
O'Connell was hired to the offensive staff of the San Francisco 49ers on February 26, 2016.

Washington Redskins

On January 20, 2017, O'Connell was hired as the Washington Redskins' quarterbacks coach, working under head coach Jay Gruden. In 2019, under interim head coach Bill Callahan, O'Connell was promoted to offensive coordinator. After the 2019–20 regular season, O'Connell was not retained by the incoming new head coach, Ron Rivera.

Los Angeles Rams
On January 16, 2020, O'Connell was hired by the Los Angeles Rams as offensive coordinator. In O'Connell's second season with the Rams, their offense ranked 2nd best in receiving touchdowns (41), 5th highest in total yards (4,893), 8th best in total touchdowns (63), and the team won Super Bowl LVI (defeating the Cincinnati Bengals, 23–20).

Minnesota Vikings 
On February 16, 2022, just three days after his Super Bowl LVI victory, O'Connell was hired by the Minnesota Vikings as the 10th head coach in their franchise history. O'Connell's Vikings hiring reunited him with quarterback Kirk Cousins, whom O'Connell had coached in 2017 (Cousins' final year with the Washington Redskins). O'Connell won his first game as head coach against the Green Bay Packers in Week 1 of the 2022 season by a score of 23–7. 

O'Connell led the Vikings to a 13–4 record on the season, tying Matt LaFleur and Jim Harbaugh for the second-most wins for a rookie head coach in NFL history. The Vikings won the NFC North for the first time since 2017, which was good enough for the NFC's third seed, but were defeated by the New York Giants in the Wild Card round by a final score of 31–24.

Head coaching record

References

External links

 Minnesota Vikings profile
 

1985 births
Living people
American football quarterbacks
Cleveland Browns coaches
Detroit Lions players
Los Angeles Rams coaches
Miami Dolphins players
Minnesota Vikings head coaches
National Football League offensive coordinators
New England Patriots players
New York Jets players
Players of American football from California
Players of American football from Knoxville, Tennessee
San Diego State Aztecs football players
San Francisco 49ers coaches
Sportspeople from Carlsbad, California
Sportspeople from Knoxville, Tennessee
Washington Redskins coaches